"Like Lightning" is a song by British indie rock band Foals, released on 22 November 2019  as the fourth single from their sixth studio album, Everything Not Saved Will Be Lost – Part 2 (2019).

Music video 
The music video for "Like Lightning" came out on 22 November 2019. The storyline was written by Virginie Kypriotis and produced by Rebecca Rice. Un Oeil Sur Tout animated the video. The video features an animate Sasquatch figure leading a worldwide charge to curbe climate change through green initiatives and eco-socialism. The music video premiered on the Music Declares Emergency website to raise awareness about climate change.

Critical reception 
Critical reception to the song was mixed. Hannah Jocelyn, writing for Pitchfork said "“Like Lightning” plays like the kind of utilitarian blues-rock that music directors reach for when The Black Keys aren’t in the licensing budget."

References

External links
 

2019 singles
2019 songs
Foals songs
Environmental songs
Songs about climate change
Songs written by Yannis Philippakis
Transgressive Records singles
Warner Records singles